Conus blanfordianus is a species of sea snail, a marine gastropod mollusk in the family Conidae, the cone snails and their allies.

Like all species within the genus Conus, these snails are predatory and venomous. They are capable of "stinging" humans, therefore live ones should be handled carefully or not at all.

Description
The size of an adult shell varies between 22 mm and 58 mm. The shell is somewhat swollen, distantly sulcate below, otherwise smooth. Its color is white, encircled by chestnut spots, clouds, and oblique and triangular markings. The spire is maculated.

Distribution
This marine species occurs in the Pacific Ocean off the Philippines, designated to be the type locality. Reports from Vanuatu and Papua New Guinea are, most likely to be of other species.

References

 Filmer R.M. (2001). A Catalogue of Nomenclature and Taxonomy in the Living Conidae 1758 – 1998. Backhuys Publishers, Leiden. 388pp.
 Tucker J.K. (2009). Recent cone species database. September 4, 2009 Edition
 Tucker J.K. & Tenorio M.J. (2009) Systematic classification of Recent and fossil conoidean gastropods. Hackenheim: Conchbooks. 296 pp
 Filmer R.M. (2011) Taxonomic review of the Conus spectrum, Conus stramineus and Conus collisus complexes (Gastropoda – Conidae). Part II: The Conus stramineus complex. Visaya 3(4): 4–66.

External links
 The Conus Biodiversity website
 
Cone Shells – Knights of the Sea

blanfordianus
Gastropods described in 1867